"Desire" is a song by Irish rock band U2 and the third track on their 1988 album, Rattle and Hum. It was released as the album's lead single on 19 September 1988, and became the band's first number-one single in the United Kingdom and Australia. It reached number three on the Billboard Hot 100 in the United States, and topped both the Modern Rock Tracks and Mainstream Rock Tracks charts, making it the first song to reach number one on both charts simultaneously. It reached number two on the Dutch Top 40. At the 31st Annual Grammy Awards, "Desire" won the 1988 Grammy Award for Best Rock Performance by a Duo or Group with Vocal.

History
U2 cite the Stooges' song "1969" as the primary influence on "Desire," which is an interpolation of the Bo Diddley beat. The band originally recorded a demo of the song at STS Studios in Dublin. After re-recording it at A&M Studios in Los Angeles, they agreed it sounded "tighter and more accurate", but according to guitarist the Edge, "it lacked feel". As a result, they abandoned the re-recording in favour of the original demo. The Edge later praised the song, saying it was "a rock & roll record – not a pop song."

Cash Box said of it that "Bono and U2 go for the groove, a Magic Bus-like throb that harkens back to who knows Who."

"Desire" debuted live on the first night of the Lovetown Tour on 21 September 1989, and appeared at almost every concert on that tour. It segued into a cover of Bob Dylan's "All Along the Watchtower".

On the Zoo TV Tour, "Desire" was re-invented with different effects on the Edge's guitar, and it opened most encores. Bono would use the song to accentuate characteristics of his onstage alteregos Mirrorball Man and MacPhisto. On the PopMart Tour, Bono and the Edge would play the song acoustically. For the Elevation Tour, it was a stripped-down electric version played at the tip of a heart-shaped walkway that extended into the audience. Adam Clayton would join in with bass just before the bridge, and Larry Mullen, Jr. played along on a single drum.

On 15 October 2004, at an appearance on British television promoting the How to Dismantle an Atomic Bomb album, Bono and Edge performed a rough electric version. On the Vertigo Tour, "Desire" was not played at all on the first three legs, and appeared just once in an acoustic form on the fourth leg in response to a fan's request in São Paulo. It made a full electric debut at the beginning of the fifth leg at the second show in Sydney; this performance was ramshackle and it was refined before appearing at four subsequent concerts. "Desire" was played sporadically during the U2 360° Tour, usually played in a semi-acoustic form. On one occasion, it was combined with Bruce Springsteen's "She's the One." It was played semi-regularly on the Innocence + Experience Tour during their b-stage set, often with Bono bringing someone from the crowd to play guitar with the band.

The song was not performed at all on The Joshua Tree Tour 2017 tour, making it the first tour on which the song was not performed. It returned to the setlist for the 2019 tour, being played to close the main set in rotation with "Angel of Harlem". The song was played at every date of the North American leg of the Experience + Innocence Tour in a remixed form, taking influences from the Hollywood Remix.

"Desire"'s B-side "Hallelujah (Here She Comes)" has never been played in full live by U2 but was debatably snippeted once during "Bullet the Blue Sky."

"Desire" has appeared on two U2 compilation albums, The Best of 1980–1990 and U218 Singles.

An early version of the song appears in the form of a studio performance in the Rattle and Hum film. "Desire" has furthermore appeared on Zoo TV: Live from Sydney (as a bonus track from a different concert), PopMart: Live from Mexico City, Elevation 2001: Live from Boston, and U2 Go Home: Live from Slane Castle, Ireland.

Music video
The music video for "Desire" was filmed in Hollywood, California and directed by Richard Lowenstein and Lynn-Maree Milburn. It is the Hollywood remix version of the song, with band members and local people in assorted places in the city, supplemented by random images pertaining to references in the song.

Track listings

Personnel
 Bono – lead vocals, harmonica
 The Edge – guitar, backing vocals
 Adam Clayton – bass guitar
 Larry Mullen Jr. – drums, percussion
 Alexandra Brown – backing vocals on Hollywood Remix
 Edna Wright – backing vocals on Hollywood Remix

Charts

Weekly charts

Year-end charts

Certifications

See also
 List of covers of U2 songs - Desire
 List of number-one singles in Australia during the 1980s
 List of number-one singles of 1988 (Ireland)
 List of number-one singles from the 1980s (New Zealand)
 List of number-one singles from the 1980s (UK)
 List of Billboard Mainstream Rock number-one songs of the 1980s
 List of Billboard number-one alternative singles of the 1980s

References

1988 singles
1988 songs
Number-one singles in Australia
Irish Singles Chart number-one singles
Island Records singles
Number-one singles in Italy
Number-one singles in New Zealand
Number-one singles in Spain
RPM Top Singles number-one singles
Song recordings produced by Jimmy Iovine
Songs written by Bono
Songs written by the Edge
Songs written by Adam Clayton
Songs written by Larry Mullen Jr.
U2 songs
UK Singles Chart number-one singles